Oüi FM (styled OÜI FM) is a French rock radio station created in 1987, and since 2019 owned by Groupe 1981 of Jean-Eric Valli.

History
OÜI FM was created in 1986 as a radio station with primarily Underground programming, and so its slogan was Le son qui a du sens (The Sound with Sense). The station was launched by Pierre Raiman, Philippe Mazière, Bertrand Jullien and Éric Mettout.

OÜI FM was part of Virgin Radio International until December 2008, when it was bought by the French radio and TV host Arthur and became part of his group known as the Arthur World Participation Group (AWPG). In 2019 Groupe 1981 (which already owns stateloos like Sud Radio and Latina) bought Oui FM. Groupe 1981 is owned by Jean-Eric Valli.

Web radio stations
 OÜI FM Alternatif
 OÜI FM Blues
 OÜI FM by DJ Zebra
 OÜI FM Collector
 OÜI FM Indé

Broadcasting area
Ouï FM can be heard mainly in the North of France, on 102.3 FM in Paris, 102.1 FM in Melun and 90.7 FM in Chantilly, as well as via the Astra 1H satellite.

References

External links 
  
  Ouï FM - LyngSat Address

Radio stations in France
Modern rock radio stations
Radio stations established in 1986
1986 establishments in France